Mamountali is a village in the Paphos District of Cyprus, located 3 km west of Pano Panagia.

References

Communities in Paphos District